Herpesviral meningitis is meningitis associated with herpes simplex virus (HSV).

HSV-2 is the most common cause of Mollaret's meningitis, a type of recurrent viral meningitis. This condition was first described in 1944 by French neurologist Pierre Mollaret. Recurrences usually last a few days or a few weeks, and resolve without treatment. They may recur weekly or monthly for approximately 5 years following primary infection.

Diagnosis
Although DNA analysis techniques such as polymerase chain reaction can be used to look for DNA of herpesviruses in spinal fluid or blood, the results may be negative, even in cases where other definitive symptoms exist.

Treatment

See also
 Herpesviral encephalitis

References

External links 

Herpes simplex virus–associated diseases
Meningitis